Sandy the Seal is a 1965 British family film directed by Robert Lynn and starring Heinz Drache, Marianne Koch and Gert Van den Bergh.  Produced and co-written by Harry Alan Towers, the film was shot in South Africa in Technicolor and Techniscope II with sequences shot on Seal Island, South Africa. The film was released in the UK by Tigon British Film Productions in 1969.

Plot
A lighthouse keeper finds an injured seal left by seal poachers.  He brings the seal to his wife and two children who learn responsibility by looking after the seal who they name Sandy.  Sandy accompanies the children on their adventures and activities and discovers the ship of the seal poachers who plan a return to the lighthouse keeper's island for more valuable pelts.

Cast
 Heinz Drache - Jan Van Heerden 
 Marianne Koch - Karen Van Heerden 
 David Richards - David 
 Anne Mervis - Anne 
 Gert Van den Bergh - Jacobson 
 Bill Brewer - Lowenstein 
 Gabriel Bayman - Lofty 
 Brian O'Shaughnessy - MacKenzie

References

External links

1965 films
British drama films
1960s English-language films
English-language South African films
Films directed by Robert Lynn
Films about pinnipeds
Films scored by Malcolm Lockyer
Films set in South Africa
Films shot in South Africa
South African drama films
1960s British films